The 1928 UK & Ireland Greyhound Racing Year was the third year of greyhound racing in the United Kingdom and Ireland.

Roll of honour

+ unofficial National Derby

Summary
The oval track form of greyhound racing continued to rapidly grow with numerous tracks, either in the process of being constructed or opening. The Greyhound Racing Association (GRA) continued to lead the way, opening or having a financial interest in new tracks opening in Ramsgate, Cardiff, Nottingham, Plymouth, Portsmouth, Brighton and Stoke-on-Trent. The GRA also moved venues in Leeds from Fullerton Park to Elland Road Greyhound Stadium which was literally next door. Other major tracks to open included three London venues; West Ham Stadium with the capacity to accommodate 100,000 spectators, Clapton Stadium designed by the famous architect Sir Owen Williams and Wimbledon Stadium which would become one of the most prominent tracks in the industry. The latter was owned by Bill (W.J) Cearns. Three tracks also opened in Wales; White City Stadium, Cardiff, White City Swansea and Cardiff Arms Park.

The National Greyhound Racing Club (NGRC) was formed, the purpose of this organisation was to govern greyhound racing and the body would be responsible for regulation and the rules of racing that came into force on 23 April. The NGRC consisted of twelve stewards usually chosen from military or police backgrounds. The first stewards included E.A.V.Stanley, Lt General Sir Edward Bethune and Major B.D.Corbett. The rules of racing were introduced and updated annually and any track wishing to be associated with them were required to agree to the rules and apply for licences. Tracks that were not licensed were called independent or 'Flapping' tracks, the latter description was not welcomed by the independent tracks. Calendars were formulated containing information for all licensed personal and anyone falling foul of the rules was subject to investigation and punishment. A passport or official identity book for every greyhound was introduced and was a vital component to ensure the policing of greyhounds at every track.      

The total annual attendance across the country for 1928 increased to 13 million 695,275 from 5,656,686 (in 1927).
With the rise in popularity there was also the growth of opposition to greyhound racing. In March a decision by Salford City Council to cease permitting advertisements of greyhound races on the back of tram tickets was passed by a vote of 26 to 14.

Competitions
Six new major events were inaugurated during the year. The Cesarewitch at West Ham and St Leger at Wembley for stayers and the Scurry Gold Cup at Clapton for sprinters were introduced in London. Three national Derby competitions were started - the Scottish Greyhound Derby at Carntyne, the Welsh Derby at Welsh White City (Cardiff) and the Irish Greyhound Derby at Harolds Cross. The Welsh Derby was not considered a classic event at this stage.

Mick the Miller
The first great champion of greyhound racing emerged when on 18 April, Mick the Miller won on debut at Shelbourne Park but was overshadowed by his brother Macoma five days later. Macoma also trained by Horan broke the world record time for 500 yards beating the existing record holder Kriesler in a time of 28.80 sec. Later in the same month the pair went to Celtic Park to contest the Abercorn Cup and during a gallop Macoma caught his leg in the mesh traps breaking his hock. Mick the Miller finished third in the final but made a name for himself when equaling the world record of 28.80 at Shelbourne, a race sandwiched in between the semi and final at Celtic Park. Then Mick the Miller was struck down with distemper. There were no vaccine available and his chances of survival were slim but Arthur 'Doc' Callanan, who was the manager of Shelbourne Park as well as being a qualified veterinary surgeon on site nursed him back to health. In the August, both Mick the Miller and Macoma were put up for sale by Father Brophy. Macoma was sold for 290 guineas but Mick the Millers reserve was not met, a fortunate moment for his owner Father Brophy.

Ireland
The Irish Derby was unofficial because Harolds Cross decided to run a 'National Derby' without consulting the Irish racing authorities. This was a practice they would continue to do until the formation of classic races in 1932. Also in Ireland it was clear that the 1926 Betting Act passed by the Oireachtas, Dáil Éireann was benefitting the Irish government with funds from the tax it received from gambling. The 5% off course tax and 2.5% on course tax also seemed to be a catalyst for new track builds in Ireland. However a proposed government amendment to tax the unregulated Irish flapping tracks was defeated 66 votes to 48.       In Ireland the Harolds Cross Parish Church held sermons called "The Moral Challenge of Greyhound Racing" and the "Religion and the Gambling Spirit".

1928 Unofficial Irish Derby
The winner of the 1928 Irish Greyhound Derby was Tipperary Hills. On Thursday 16 August, Tipperary Hills (Billy Quinn), Curristown (John Shannon) and Happy Man won the semi finals. Tipperary Hills defeated PJ Graham's Battle Island by one length in 30.72 sec, Curristown defeated Gilly Gooly by two lengths in 30.95 sec and the third and final semi final was won by Happy Man (M Hammond) from False Favourite (C Forde) by four lengths in 31.10 sec.

Tracks opened

Major Competitions inaugurated 
 Scottish Greyhound Derby at Carntyne Stadium
 Scurry Gold Cup at Clapton Stadium
 St Leger at Wembley Stadium
 Cesarewitch at West Ham Stadium
 Welsh Derby at White City Stadium (Cardiff)

Principal UK races

Principal Irish finals

Key
U = unplaced

References 

Greyhound racing in the United Kingdom
Greyhound racing in the Republic of Ireland
1928 in British sport
1928 in Irish sport
1928 in Welsh sport
1928 in Scottish sport